The 313th Air Division is an inactive United States Air Force unit. Its last assignment was with Pacific Air Forces at Kadena Air Base, Okinawa. It was inactivated on 1 October 1991.

History
The unit's origins begin with the World War II 313th Bombardment Wing, part of Twentieth Air Force. The 313th Wing engaged in very heavy bombardment Boeing B-29 Superfortress operations against Japan.

World War II

The 313th Bombardment Wing was organized at Peterson Field, Colorado in the spring of 1944 as a very heavy bombardment wing, to be equipped with the Boeing B-29 Superfortresses. Operational groups assigned to the wing were the 6th and 9th Bombardment Groups. Both were existing units with the 6th being reassigned from the Sixth Air Force in the Caribbean, where it was performing antisubmarine missions and protecting the Panama Canal from airfields in Panama. The 9th was assigned to Army Air Force Training Command in South Florida as part of its school of applied tactics. Both groups were reassigned to bases in Nebraska – to (Grand Island Army Air Field and McCook Army Air Field) respectively, where they trained initially on Boeing B-17 Flying Fortresses until their B-29 aircraft could be manufactured and made available to them. Two other bombardment groups, the 504th and 505th were formed as new units (504th at Fairmont Army Air Field, the 505th at Harvard Army Air Field), also being assigned to bases in Nebraska for training. After dealing with various training issues and also problems with the B-29s they received, the combat groups were ready to deploy to the Pacific Theater and departed for North Field, in the Northern Mariana Islands arriving during late December 1944.

On Tinian, the wing was assigned to the XXI Bomber Command of Twentieth Air Force. Once in place, the groups of the 313th "began flying missions, initially against Iwo Jima, the Truk Islands, and other Japanese held areas. Later, they flew low-level night incendiary raids on area targets in Japan; participated in mining operations in the Shimonoseki Strait, and contributed to the blockade of the Japanese Empire by mining harbors in Japan and Korea. In April 1945 the 313th assisted the invasion of Okinawa by bombing Japanese airfields used by kamikaze pilots."

A fifth group, the 509th Composite Group, was assigned to the wing in May 1945 from Wendover Army Air Field, Utah. The 509th, although assigned to the 313th Bomb Wing, was operationally controlled by Headquarters, Twentieth Air Force. The 509th was given a base area near the airfield on the north tip of Tinian, several miles from the main installations in the center part of the island where the other groups were assigned. Also unlike the other groups in the wing, the 509th used a wide variety of tail codes from various XXI bomber Command groups, instead of using its own, so that the group's planes could not be identified by the Japanese. The 509th was also self-contained, and drew little in resources from the 313th Wing or its other groups.

In early August, the mission of the 509th was revealed when the group flew the Atomic Bomb missions to Hiroshima and Nagasaki. In November, the 509th was relieved from assignment to the 313th Bomb Wing and moved to Roswell Army Air Field, New Mexico.

"After the Japanese surrender in August, 313th Bomb Wing units dropped food and supplies to Allied prisoners and participated in show-of-force flights over Japan."* 505th Bombardment Group: 23 December – 30 June 1946 As part of the postwar drawdown of forces, two of the Wing's groups, the 504th and 505th were inactivated in late 1945 and early 1946.

Another group, the 383d, was reassigned to the 313th Bombardment Wing from Eighth Air Force in September 1945 after the Eighth was drawn down on Okinawa. The Eighth Air Force was planned to be a second strategic Air Force to be used during the Invasion of Japan which never materialized. The 383d was inactivated in December with its aircraft and personnel returning to the United States.

Pacific Air Forces

In March 1946, the 313th was reassigned to Thirteenth Air Force in the Philippines. In the Philippines, the wing was assigned the 5th Bombardment Group from Seventh Air Force "where it conducted bombardment training, aerial reconnaissance and mapping and construction projects." The 5th Reconnaissance Group conducted many clandestine mapping missions over non-friendly areas of Asia during the postwar era. The wing itself began phasing down for inactivation in late 1947, with the 6th and 9th bomb groups being inactivated in June 1947, and finally the 5th bomb group in January 1948. The 313th Bombardment Wing was itself inactivated in June 1948.

In March 1955, the organization was redesignated as the United States Air Force 313th Air Division as part of Far East Air Forces' Fifth Air Force, at Kadena Air Base, Okinawa.  The mission of the 313th AD was the command and control of USAF units assigned to Okinawa.

Throughout the years of the Cold War, the 313th AD assumed "responsibility for air defense of the Ryukyu Islands and tactical operations in the Far East, maintaining assigned forces at the highest possible degree of combat readiness. In addition, it supported Fifth Air Force in the development, planning, and coordination of requirements for future Air Force operations in the Ryukyu Islands. The division also supported numerous PACAF exercises such as Cope Thunder, Cope Diamond, Team Spirit, and Cope North"

The 313th was inactivated on 1 October 1991 as part of a general drawdown of USAF forces in the Pacific after the end of the Cold War.

Lineage
 Established as the 313th Bombardment Wing, Very Heavy on 15 April 1944
 Activated on 23 April 1944
 Inactivated on 15 June 1948
 Redesignated 313th Air Division on 3 January 1955
 Activated on 1 March 1955
 Inactivated on 1 October 1991

Assignments
 Second Air Force, 23 April – 8 June 1944
 XXI Bomber Command, 8 June 1944 – 16 July 1945
 Twentieth Air Force, 16 July 1945 – 13 March 1946
 Thirteenth Air Force, 13 March 1946 – 15 June 1948
 Fifth Air Force, 1 March 1955 – 1 October 1991

Units assigned

World War II
 6th Bombardment Group: 28 December 1944 – 1 June 1947
 9th Bombardment Group: 28 December 1944 – 9 June 1947
 72d Air Service Group: 28 December 1944 – 1 June 1947
 77th Air Service Group: 28 December 1944 – 9 June 1947
 358th Air Service Group: 23 December 1944 – 15 June 1946
 359th Air Service Group: 23 December – 30 June 1946
 383d Bombardment Group: 12 September – 19 December 1945
 390th Air Service Group: 29 May – c. 17 October 1945
 504th Bombardment Group: 23 December 1944 – 15 June 1946
 505th Bombardment Group: 23 December – 30 June 1946
 509th Composite Group: 29 May – c. 17 October 1945 (attached to Twentieth Air Force)

United States Air Force
Wings
 18th Fighter-Bomber Wing (later, 18th Tactical Fighter Wing): attached 1 March 1955 – 1 February 1957, assigned 10 November 1958 – 1 October 1991
 51st Fighter-Interceptor Wing: 1 March 1955 – 31 May 1971
 374th Tactical Airlift Wing: 1 November 1968 – 31 May 1971

Groups
 5th Bombardment Group (later, 5th Reconnaissance Group): 10 June 1946 – 5 February 1947; 15 March 1947 – 10 January 1948
 581st Air Resupply Group:  March 1955 – 1 September 1956
 1962d Communications Group: 1 Oct 90 – 1 Oct 91

Squadrons
 5th Reconnaissance Squadron: 15 June 1946 – 3 February 1947
 24th Combat Mapping Squadron: 1 April – 15 June 1946.
 38th Reconnaissance Squadron: 15 March – 20 April 1947
 322d Troop Carrier Squadron: 18 September 1956 – 12 February 1957
 623rd Aircraft Control & Warning Squadron: 15 March 1955 – 17 July 1960

Stations
 Peterson Field, Colorado, 23 April – 5 November 1944
 North Field, Tinian, Mariana Islands, 24 December 1944 – 17 February 1946
 Clark Field (later Clark Air Base), Luzon, Philippines, 17 February 1946 – 15 June 1948
 Kadena Air Base, Okinawa, 1 March 1955 – 1 October 1991

See also

 List of United States Air Force air divisions

References

Notes
 Explanatory notes

 Citations

Bibliography

 
 
 
 

Japan campaign
World War II strategic bombing units
World War II aerial operations and battles of the Pacific theatre
Air divisions of the United States Air Force
1955 establishments in Japan
1991 disestablishments in Japan
1944 establishments in Colorado
1948 disestablishments in the Philippines